Below is a list of footballers who have played for Norwich City in 25-99 competitive first-team matches.

Key 
The list is ordered first by date of debut, and then alphabetically by surname. Appearances as a substitute are included. Players are listed according to the date they signed for the club – those with their names in bold have been inducted into the Norwich City F.C. Hall of Fame. Statistics are correct as of the match played on 7 May 2017.Where a player left the club permanently after this date, his statistics are updated to his date of leaving.

Position

Playing positions are listed according to the tactical formations that were employed at the time. Thus the change in the names of defensive and midfield positions reflects the tactical evolution that occurred from the 1960s onwards.

Club career

This is defined as the first and last calendar years in which the player appeared for the club in any of the competitions listed below.

Appearances and goals

League appearances and goals comprise those in the Southern League, the Football League and the Premier League. Appearances in the 1939–40 Football League season, abandoned after three games because of the Second World War, are excluded. Total appearances and goals comprise those in the Football Alliance, Football League (including play-offs), Premier League, FA Cup, Football League Cup, UEFA Cup, Associate Members' Cup/Football League Trophy, and defunct competitions the Anglo-Italian Cup, Anglo-Scottish Cup, Watney Cup, Texaco Cup, Full Members' Cup and ScreenSport Super Cup. Matches in wartime competitions are excluded.

International selection

Players who have been selected for full international football (not including amateur, Under-23 or other youth levels) have a link to their national side's Wikipedia page, denoted with a green box and asterisk*. Only the highest level of international competition is given, except where a player competed for more than one country, in which case the highest level reached for each is shown.

References 

Players
Norwich City
List
Association football player non-biographical articles